Morricone may refer to:

 Morricone Youth, an American band
 152188 Morricone, an asteroid

People with the surname
 Andrea Morricone (born 1964), Italian composer and conductor
 Ennio Morricone (1928–2020), Italian composer, orchestrator, conductor, and trumpet player